is a Japanese former Nippon Professional Baseball infielder, and current first squad hitting coach for the Fukuoka SoftBank Hawks of Nippon Professional Baseball (NPB).

He previously played for the Fukuoka Daiei Hawks and the Tokyo Yakult Swallows.

Early baseball career
Yoshimoto went on to Kyushu Gakuin High School, where he participated in the 80th Japanese High School Baseball Championship in the summer of his junior year with Hisashi Takayama, a year below him.

Professional career

Active player era
On November 20, 1998, Yoshimoto was drafted by the Fukuoka Daiei Hawks in the 1998 Nippon Professional Baseball draft.

He played only 95 games in his 10 seasons with the Hawks. And he became a free agent in the off season of 2008 and moved to the Tokyo Yakult Swallows in the 2009 season.

He played 54 games in three seasons with the Swallows, but decided to retire as a free agent off the 2011 season. 

Yoshimoto had a total of 149 games played as an active player with a .227 batting average, 54 hits, one home run, and 34 RBI.

After retirement
Yoshimoto served on the team operations staff of the Fukuoka SoftBank Hawks from the 2012-2017 season and became the hitting coach for the third squad in the 2018 season.

He has served as second squad hitting coach since the 2022 season, and first squad hitting coach since the 2023 season.

References

External links

 Career statistics - NPB.jp 
 77 Ryo Yoshimoto PLAYERS2022 - Fukuoka SoftBank Hawks Official site

1980 births
Living people
Baseball people from Kumamoto Prefecture 
Japanese baseball players
Nippon Professional Baseball infielders
Fukuoka Daiei Hawks players
Fukuoka SoftBank Hawks players
Tokyo Yakult Swallows players
Japanese baseball coaches
Nippon Professional Baseball coaches